KBTE (104.9 FM), known as "104.9 The Beat", is an Urban Contemporary formatted radio station owned by Alpha Media of Lubbock, Texas. Their city of license is Tulia, Texas and serves the Lubbock area with an ERP of 96,600 Watts.  Its studios are located in south Lubbock on Avenue Q west of I-27, and its transmitter is located southeast of Plainview, Texas in unincorporated Hale County.

History
KBTE signed on the air as KDOA in 1988. The station has aired a Rhythmic music format since 2003, with a heavy emphasis on R&B/Hip-Hop hits. Before the station acquired the urban contemporary format, KBTE was an active rock station as "The Bat"; however the station began stunting with loops of The Go-Go's 1980s song "We Got The Beat" before the launch of The Beat.

External links
KBTE official website

BTE
Urban contemporary radio stations in the United States
Radio stations established in 1988
Alpha Media radio stations